The following is a timeline of the history of the city of Santander, Cantabria, Spain.

Prior to 20th century

 13th C. CE - Santander Cathedral construction begins.
 1552 - Charles V. landed here to take possession of the Spanish crown.
 1754 - Roman Catholic Diocese of Santander established.
 1755 - Made a city.
 1785 - Consulado (merchant guild) established.
 1808 - Town sacked by French forces.
 1839 -  (lighthouse) commissioned.
 1842 -  (market) built.
 1857
 Banco Santander (bank) established.
 Population: 28,907.
 1868 - 's recreational "bathing establishment" created.
 1872 -  newspaper begins publication.
 1875 - Tram begins operating.
 1893 - 3 November:  explodes in harbour.
 1895 -  newspaper begins publication.
 1900 - Population: 54,564.

20th century

 1902 - El Diario Montañés newspaper begins publication.
 1908 - Biblioteca Municipal de Santander (library) and  open.
 1910 - Population: 65,046.
 1912 - Palacio de la Magdalena built.
 1913
 Racing de Santander football club formed.
 Estadio El Sardinero (stadium) opens.
 1916 - Gran Casino del Sardinero opens.
 1926 -  (museum) established.
 1929 - Marqués de Valdecilla University Hospital founded.
 1937 - August: Nationalists in power.
 1940 - Population: 101,793.
 1941 - Fire.
 1946 -  becomes mayor.
 1952 - Festival Internacional de Santander active.
 1970 - Population: 149,704.
 1972 - University of Santander established.
 1975 - CB Cantabria handball team formed.
 1981 -  (museum) opens.
 1987 -  becomes mayor.
 1988 - Campos de Sport de El Sardinero (stadium) opens.
 1991
 Palacio de Festivales built.
 Population: 196,218.
 1995 -  becomes mayor.
 1997 - Hospital Virtual Valdecilla founded

21st century

 2007
 Íñigo de la Serna becomes mayor.
 Las Llamas Atlantic Park opens.

See also
 Santander history
 History of Santander (in Spanish)
 List of mayors of Santander (in Spanish)
 History of Cantabria
 List of municipalities in Cantabria

References

This article incorporates information from the Spanish Wikipedia.

Bibliography

in English

in Spanish

External links

 
santander